Intimacy is the fourth studio album by American pop singer Jody Watley, released in 1993 (see 1993 in music) on MCA.

Track listing

Tracks 1, 3, 7 Copyright A Diva Music-Rightsong/Ultrawave Music-EMI April Music. Tracks 2, 8 Copyright A Diva Music-Rightsong/Art & Rhythm Inc-Zomba Enterprises. Track 4 Copyright Jobete Music-Black Bull Music. Track 5 Copyright WB Music-Kulu Shay Music-Tix Music-Interscope Music-Thug Music/Brandi Jo Music-Famous Music Corp. 
Track 6 Copyright A Diva Music-Rightsong/Def Mix Music-EMI Music/EMI April Music/EMI Virgin Music. Track 9 Copyright A Diva Music-Rightsong/Big Giant Music-Coffey-Nettlesby Music-Warner Tamerlane Music. Track 10 Copyright Ultrawave Music-EMI April Music/Sizzling Blue Music-Warner Tamerlane Music.

Personnel

Jody Watley – vocals, backing vocals
André Cymone – drums, bass, keyboards, guitars
Brian Kilgorec – percussion
Scott Mayo – saxophone
Tommy Morgan – harmonica
Larry "Rock" Campbell – drum, keyboard programming
Chris Hunter – trumpet
Peter "Ski" Schwartz – keyboard programming
Terry Burrus – keyboard programming

David Morales - drum programming
Chris Botti – flute
Terry Coffey – keyboards, synthesizers, rhythm arrangements
Jon Nettlesbey – keyboards, synthesizers, drums, percussion, rhythm arrangements
Duane Nettlesbey – additional programming
Gene Page – string arrangements, conductor
Paulette McWilliams – backing vocals
Brenda White-King – backing vocals
Alpha Anderson Barfield – backing vocals

Production

Producers – Art & Rhythm (for Zomba Recording Inc.), André Cymone, Philip Kelsey, David Morales (for Def Mix Productions), John Nettlesbey & Terry Coffey (for Mercenary Productions)
Executive producer – Jody Watley
Engineers – Wolfgang Aichholz, Bobby Brooks, Pete Christensen, André Cymone, Hugo Dwyer, John Poppo, Chris Purham, David Sussman, Chris Trevett
Assistant engineers – Pete Christensen, Rail Jon Rogut
Mixing – Bobby Brooks, Alan Meyerson, David Morales, John Poppo, David Rideau, Chris Trevett
Mixing assistants – Kimm James, Will Williams
Remixing – Andre Fischer, Philip Kelsey, Dave Way
Remix assistant – Bill Leonard
Mastering – Steve Hall
Production coordination – Ivy Skoff

Charts

Weekly charts

Singles

References

External links

Jody Watley albums
1993 albums
albums arranged by Gene Page
albums produced by André Cymone
MCA Records albums